Herbert Walter Levi (January 3, 1921 – November 3, 2014) was professor emeritus of zoology and curator of arachnology at the Museum of Comparative Zoology, Harvard University. He was born in Germany, and was educated there and at Leighton Park School, Reading in England. He then received his higher education at the University of Connecticut and the University of Wisconsin. Levi authored about 150 scientific papers on spiders and on biological conservation. He is the author of the popular Golden Guide Spiders and their Kin, with Lorna Rose Levi (his wife) and Herbert Zim.

Levi received the 2007 Eugene Simon Award from the International Society of Arachnology "for his immense influence on US spider research".
He was an elected honorary member of the American Arachnological Society.

Levi was an editorial board member for the Journal of Arachnology.

The pseudoscorpion genus Levichelifer, the spider species Anisaedus levii and the whip spider species Phrynus levii are named in his honor.

Selected publications

References

External links
Herb Levi , Museum of Comparative Zoology, Harvard University

1921 births
2014 deaths
Arachnologists
American arachnologists
University of Connecticut alumni
University of Wisconsin–Madison alumni
German expatriates in the United Kingdom
German emigrants to the United States
Harvard University staff